The tenth season of American talent show competition series America's Got Talent was broadcast on NBC from May 26 to September 16, 2015. After the previous season, the format of the second round of auditions was changed to a more competitive stage under the title "Judge Cuts", with each episode under this new arrangement featuring a guest judge. For the first use of the format, the guest judges included Neil Patrick Harris, Michael Bublé, Marlon Wayans, and Piers Morgan.

Other changes included the "Golden Buzzer" format that was introduced in the previous season to match the arrangement used across the Got Talent franchise, and minor adjustments to the Wildcard format. The online public voting system was also amended, by renaming it to coincide with the program's newest sponsor for the year. As the program was entering its tenth year of broadcast, two specials were produced to celebrate ten years of America's Got Talent and Got Talent respectively. The first, "10 Years of Talent", aired on July 29, 2015. The second, "World's Got Talent", aired on August 5, 2015.

The tenth season was won by ventriloquist Paul Zerdin, with comedian Drew Lynch finishing in second, and mentalist Oz Pearlman placing third. During its broadcast, the season averaged around 10.28 million viewers.

Season overview 
Open auditions began in late 2014, between November and December, in the cities of Tampa, Nashville, Richmond (New York), Chicago, St. Louis, San Antonio, Albuquerque, San Francisco, Seattle, Boise, Los Angeles and Las Vegas. Online auditions were also accepted. Judges' auditions took place in the same venues as last year, between March and May 2015, with a special session for extreme performances held at a venue in Pomona, California. With the program entering its tenth year, special compilation episodes were incorporated to celebrate the wide range of talent that had appeared on America's Got Talent, and within the Got Talent franchise. This included some of the best acts, the most heartwarming stories, the oddest personalities, and the biggest show-stopping moments from the last 10 years. Updates on what some of these acts were currently doing were also shown, along with notable changes to the format of the program for the tenth season.

The second round of auditions changed to a live audience format titled "Judge Cuts". Held at a fixed venue, the new format had participants being divided into groups, with each group's participants required to each conduct a new performance before the judges. Along with a guest judge for each group, acts could only secure a place in the live rounds if they gained a majority vote from the panel. Judge Cuts operated on a similar arrangement to the Judges' auditions. The main judges could stop a performance with their buzzers, the panel could give feedback on a performance once it had ended, and filming of this stage included recordings of the host in the wings of the venue's stage. As the new stage would be held over several weeks (rather than a single week), the broadcast schedule of the program had to be altered, leading to the number of quarter-finals being reduced as a result. This effectively decreased the number of quarter-finalists the competition would have. The first use of the format saw the involvement of the following celebrities: actor Neil Patrick Harris, singer Michael Bublé, actor Marlon Wayans and former AGT judge Piers Morgan.

Another change brought in was the format of the "Golden Buzzer", to coincide with the other editions of Got Talent. The use of the buzzer would allow any participant receiving it to be granted an automatic place in the live rounds, which took into consideration the new audition stage being introduced. While the main judges could only use the buzzer in the first stage, the guest judges could only use it during the second stage for a participant within the group they each oversaw. The Wildcard format from previous seasons was also changed. The judges would pick Wildcard quarter-finalists from any three participants eliminated in the Judge Cuts, regardless of whether the act was televised or not, as well as a single Wildcard semi-finalist from any participant eliminated in the quarter-finals. The online public voting system was also changed, not only in its name to reflect the change of sponsor for America's Got Talent for 2015, but also in allowing the public to vote between the participants in each quarter-final (those who placed 6th, 7th and 8th in the main public vote respectively) for a place in the semi-finals. While the judges voted on which of the two they didn't select for a final place in the next stage, the system for the semi-finals operated the same as before, but it was dropped entirely from being used in the finals. Prior to the start of the live rounds, two participants were forced to withdraw, one of whom had another engagement that would have conflicted with their involvement in the competition (leading to them being replaced by acts that had originally been eliminated in the Judge Cuts).

Thirty-six of the participants who auditioned for this season secured a place in the live quarter-finals, with twelve quarter-finalists performing in each show. These included: comedian Drew Lynch, contemporary dance duo Freckled Sky, gospel singer Sharon Irving and classical singer Arielle Baril, who had each received a golden buzzer from the main judges; magician Piff the Magic Dragon, singing duet The Craig Lewis Band, ventriloquist Paul Zerdin, and Japanese light-and-sound dance troupe Siro-A, who had each received a golden buzzer from the guest judges; acrobatic dance duo Craig & Micheline, flyboarder Damone Rippy and gymnastic team Showproject, who were chosen as Wild Card quarter-finalists. About twenty-two quarter-finalists advanced and were split between the two semi-finals, including motocross team Metal Mulisha Fitz Army chosen as the Wildcard semi-finalist, with ten semi-finalists securing a place in the finals. These are the results of each participant's overall performance in the season:

 |  |  |  | 
 |  Wildcard Quarter-finalist |  Wildcard Semi-finalist
 Golden Buzzer - Auditions |  Golden Buzzer - Judge Cuts

  Ages denoted for a participant(s), pertain to their final performance for this season.
  The ages of Craig & Micheline were not disclosed on the program.
  These participants were replacements for those who withdrew from the competition, despite securing a place in the live rounds.
  No actual information on the puppeteer for this act was disclosed by the show, other than the location they came from.
  For health and safety reasons, Metal Mulisha Fitz Army live round performances were pre-recorded at another site.
  Locations denote where members of this group came from.

Quarter-finals summary
 Buzzed Out |  Judges' choice | 
 |  |

Quarter-final 1 (August 11) 
Guest Performers, Results Show: The Rockettes, Mat Franco, and OMI

Quarter-final 2 (August 18) 
Guest Performers, Results Show: Emily West, and William Close

  Due to the majority vote for 3 Shades of Blue, Klum's voting intention was not revealed.
  For health & safety reasons, Damone Rippy's performance had to be pre-recorded at another site.

Quarter-final 3 (August 25) 
Guest Performers, Results Show: Cast of Le Rêve

  Metal Mulisha Fitz Army were later appointed the judges' WildCard semi-finalist.

Semi-finals summary
 Buzzed Out |  Judges' choice | 
 |  |

Semi-final 1 (September 1) 
Guest Performers, Results Show: The Illusionists, Taylor Williamson

Semi-final 2 (September 8) 
Guest Performers, Results Show: Little Mix, and AcroArmy

Finals (September 15–16) 
Guest Performers, Performance show: The Rockettes, Flo Rida

 |  |  | 

  Oz Pearlman, Piff the Magic Dragon and Derek Hughes conducted a joint routine for their second performance, and thus shared the same guest performers.
  Although they lost in the semi-finals, Freelusion were given a special invite to conduct a joint routine with Uzeyer Novruzov for his second performance.
  Drew Lynch and Gary Vider conducted a joint routine for their second performance, and thus shared the same guest performers.

Ratings
The following ratings are based upon those published by Nielsen Media Research after this season's broadcast:

Specials

References

2015 American television seasons
America's Got Talent seasons